Goldilocks or "Goldilocks and the Three Bears" is a 19th-century fairy tale.

Goldilocks may also refer to:

Media and entertainment
 Goldilocks (comics), a supervillain in the DC universe
 Goldilocks (musical), a 1958 stage show by Jean and Walter Kerr and Leroy Anderson
 Goldilocks (film), a 1971 animated special starring Bing Crosby
 Goldilocks (album), the soundtrack album
 "Goldilocks and the Three Bears" (Faerie Tale Theatre), an episode of Faerie Tale Theatre
 The Story of Pretty Goldilocks, a French fairy tale by Madame d'Aulnoy
 Goldilocks, a character in Fables
 Goldy Locks (born 1979), musician and professional wrestler
 Princess Goldilocks , a 1973 Czechoslovak television film

Astronomy and physics
 Goldilocks (planet), a nickname of the extrasolar planet 70 Virginis b
 Goldilocks planet, a planet that falls within a star's habitable zone
 Goldilocks zone, the habitable region in a stellar-centered orbit
 Cosmic Jackpot or The Goldilocks Enigma: Why is the Universe Just Right for Life?, a 2007 book by Paul Davies

Other uses
 Goldilocks Bakeshop, a bakeshop chain in the Philippines
 Goldilocks economy, an economy that is not too hot or cold
 Goldilocks principle, the idea that something must fall between two extremes
 Goldilocks Process, a process of initiating and sustaining systemic change
 The goldilocks buttercup, Ranunculus auricomus
 The goldilocks aster, Galatella linosyris